Milton Eugene Gardner (February 10, 1901 – 1986) was an American physicist who worked on radar systems at the Radiation Laboratory in Massachusetts.

Early life
He was born in Santa Cruz, California, but would have been born in China if his father, a missionary under the American Board of Missions, had not returned temporarily to the United States for safety during the Boxer Rebellion.

After spending the first nine years of his life China, Milton moved with his family to Claremont, California where he completed his elementary and secondary education and received a B.A. degree from Pomona College in 1924. While at Pomona, Milton competed successfully in athletics competitions, and became quite a good ventriloquist and magician and belonged to the International Brotherhood of Magicians. After graduating from college, he worked at several jobs before starting graduate work in physics at UC Berkeley where he received his M.A. degree in 1934, with a thesis on "The recombination of ions in pure oxygen as a function of pressure and temperature." He received his Ph.D. degree in 1936. In 1937, Milton accepted a position as an "instructor in physics" at the then "Branch of the College of Agriculture at Davis" where he remained until his retirement as professor of physics in 1968.

Career
From 1942 to 1946, he joined the MIT Radiation Laboratory in Cambridge, Massachusetts where he helped in that gigantic effort to develop and improve the radar systems which were of major importance in enabling the Allied Forces to overcome the German and Japanese aggressors.

He spent the 1955-56 year at the University of Peshawar in Pakistan.

References

20th-century American physicists
Accelerator physicists
American nuclear physicists
Experimental physicists
Manhattan Project people
1901 births
1986 deaths
Academic staff of the University of Peshawar
American expatriate academics
American expatriates in Pakistan
Pomona College alumni